Edmund Jüssen (1830 – February 17, 1891) was a German-American politician and diplomat.

Biography
Jüssen was the son of Jacob Jüssen (1802–1880), who served as postmaster of Columbus, Wisconsin in the 1860s, and Catharina Rütz Jüssen (1811–1891). Edmund Jüssen came to the Wisconsin Territory from Germany in 1847. He opened a store in Columbus. He then moved to Saint Louis, Missouri but returned to Columbus. He studied law and was admitted to the Wisconsin bar.

Jüssen served in the Wisconsin State Assembly in 1862 as a Republican. He served in the 23rd Wisconsin Volunteer Infantry Regiment as a lieutenant-colonel in the American Civil War. After the war he practiced law in Chicago, Illinois.

He was United States Consul General in Vienna, Austria-Hungary, in 1885. His father, Jacob Jüssen, until 1848 mayor of Jülich, Rhine Province, Kingdom of Prussia, was an uncle of Carl Schurz.

He died in Frankfurt, German Empire, while returning to the United States. He was buried at Rosehill Cemetery in Chicago.

References

1830 births
1891 deaths
People from Columbus, Wisconsin
People of Wisconsin in the American Civil War
Businesspeople from Wisconsin
German emigrants to the United States
Illinois lawyers
Wisconsin lawyers
American consuls
19th-century American politicians
19th-century American businesspeople
19th-century American lawyers
Republican Party members of the Wisconsin State Assembly